Triantafyllos "Lakis" Stergioudas  (born 10 December 1955) is Greek former professional footballer who played as a goalkeeper.

Club career
Stergioudas started from the academy of the amateur club of his birthplace, Thermaikos Portaria, but he played and made up his first team debut in the historic club of Chalkidiki, Niki Polygyrou. In 1972, at the age of 17, he impressed the people of AEK Athens, which resulted in his transfer to the Athenian team. Stergioudas became a first team regular and in 1977 he was in the squad that reached the semi-finals of the UEFA Cup. Stergioudas won with AEK two championships in a row and two cups including a double, in 1978.

In summer of 1984 Stergioudas was transferred to PAOK, where he won another championship, while he was a finalist in the cup the same year, where the club of Thessaloniki lost to AEL in a 4–1 defeat. With the conquest of the championship of 1985, Stergioudas became the only player to win a championship with both AEK and PAOK. In 1986 he decided to retire from professional football.

International career
Stergioudas played for Greece for two years. His debut took place on 10 November 1976  in the home friendly match, in Kavala, against Austria, when under the guidance of Lakis Petropoulos he was a key player in the entire match. His last appearance took place on 21 September 1977 in the away friendly match against Romania, this time under the technical guidance of Alketas Panagoulias where he again played in the whole match.

Honours

AEK Athens
Alpha Ethniki: 1977–78, 1978–79
Greek Cup: 1977–78, 1982–83

PAOK
Alpha Ethniki: 1984–85

References

External links

The Introduction Page of the RSSSF -- The Rec.Sport.Soccer Statistics Foundation.

1955 births
Living people
Footballers from Moudania
Greek footballers
Greece international footballers
Association football goalkeepers
AEK Athens F.C. players
PAOK FC players
Super League Greece players